Sir Maung Khin KCIE (also spelled Maung Kin, U Khin and U Kin; 1872 – 22 September 1924) was the first Burmese judge of the Chief Court of Lower Burma during the British colonial era, and the first Burmese to be knighted. Maung Khin was known as a good, clean administrator, widely respected by the public.

Personal history

Maung Khin was born to Kya Hnaing and Po Kyaw in Rangoon (Yangon) in 1872, twenty years after the British had captured Lower Burma. Maung Khin studied at Rangoon's elite St. Paul's English High School and Rangoon College, and proceeded to read law in the United Kingdom. After passing the law exam at Middle Temple in 1898, he returned to Yangon and worked as a barrister. In 1921, Maung Khin became first Burmese judge of the Chief Court of Lower Burma. In 1923, he was appointed Internal Minister and made a Knight Commander of the Order of the Indian Empire, and became the first Burmese man to receive the title "Sir".

Sir Maung's hobbies were horse riding and gardening. He died on 22 September 1924. He was survived by his wife and their son Myo Kin and daughter Kin Kin E.

References

Members of the Middle Temple
University of Yangon alumni
Knights Commander of the Order of the Indian Empire
1872 births
1924 deaths
British Burma judges
Burmese knights